Fiona Jane François (born Fiona Jane Mackay, 22 May 1980) is the chairman and former President of the British American Business Council, Los Angeles Chapter. She was formerly HM Consul and Director for the Western Region of UK Trade & Investment's US Network.

Biography
Born in York, North Yorkshire, she studied Economics, Politics and Sociology at the University of Northumbria at Newcastle upon Tyne where she graduated with honours before joining Her Majesty's service. In 2009 Fiona François was appointed HM Consul and Director for the Western Region of UK Trade & Investment's US Network. Based at the British Consulate-General in Los Angeles,

InvestCloud
Fiona François is President, Sales Operations at InvestCloud, a California founded company that has grown from an idea in a garage to a platform with 670 clients & over $1.7 of assets in just 7 years. Headquartered in Los Angeles.

Britweek
Fiona François is a Member of the Board of BritWeek, a not for profit organization focusing on the British contribution to business, film, fashion and music in Southern California.

Brits Give Back
Through Britweek, Francois supports various charities including, LA's BEST, Malaria No More, Save The Children, Virgin Unite

Business Innovation Awards
Fiona François created the first ever UKTI / Britweek Business Innovation Awards in 2010 for Businesses with joint operations in the UK and California to be recognized for their achievements in innovation before an audience of elite international commercial players, as well as the wider California business community. François shortlists finalist in each category to be judged by renowned business leaders. Past judges were, Andy Bird Chairman of Walt Disney International, Ian Callum Design Director for Jaguar, Carlos Amezcua, Co-Anchor Fox 11 News and Sir Ken Robinson Internationally Renowned Creativity Expert. Past honored speakers were Simon Cowell, Nigel Lythgoe will.i.am and Frank Mottek.

British American Business Council
Fiona is President of the British American Business Council (BABC) and actively supports the chapters in Los Angeles, Orange County, San Francisco, the Pacific North West, Chicago and Houston

L.A. Business Journal's "Women Making A Difference" Awards
In 2013, François was one of the top 5 finalists for the L.A. Business Journal's "Women Making A Difference" Awards. Fiona was one of 252 nominees for the 2013 Awards in the "Rising Star" category.

Career and professional appointments

 (2002–2004) Policy Advisor for the Scottish Government
 (2004–2008) Senior Policy Advisor for The Department for Business, Innovation & Skills (BIS)
 (2007–2008) Policy Advisor for HM Tresaury 
 (2008 2009) Senior Policy Advisor for The Department for International Development (DFID)
 (2009 to 2014) HM Consul and Regional Director UKTI West Coast
 (2009 to present) Appointed to the Board of Britweek
 (2009 to present) Distinguished member of the British American Business Council, Los Angeles Chapter
 (2012 to 2014) Foreign Direct Investment Director for UK Trade and Investment USA Network
 (2013 to present) Member of the British Academy of Film and Television Arts (BAFTA) Los Angeles
 (2014 to present) Chief of Staff at InvestCloud
 (2016 to present) President of the British American Business Council, Los Angeles Chapter

Publications and presentations
 (April 2010) Organizer and Speaker, Britweek and UKTI Business Innovation Awards in Beverly Hills, California
 (April 2011) Organizer and Speaker, Britweek and UKTI Business Innovation Award at the Fairmont San Francisco Hotel, as part of the 2011 BABC Conference.
 (March 2012) Honored Guest Speaker, British American Business Council Pacific North West Annual General Meeting in Seattle, WA
 (April 2012) Organizer and Speaker, Britweek and UKTI Business Innovation Awards in Beverly Hills, California
 (April 2013) Organizer and Speaker, Britweek and UKTI Business Innovation Awards in Beverly Hills, California

Other appearances
Britweek, Emmy's, Golden Globe, Sundance, BABC, Other

References

Living people
1980 births
British diplomats
People from York
British expatriates in the United States